Transeamus ("We travel on") is a classical and choral studio album by the British male vocal quartet Hilliard Ensemble. This album is the last album of the band, and was released in the label ECM New Series, in October 2014.

Composition
On this album, the Hilliard Ensemble sings a collection of polyphony from the 15th century, most of them are from anonymous authors, but some of them was written by John Plummer, Walter Lambe, William Cornysh and Sheryngham. Transeamus also includes several ancient carols on a Christmas theme. About the album, David James tells that "This is music that we were born and bred to sing. We started singing many of these pieces as boys in choirs, so singing this music is for us like going home."

Reception
James Manheim in his review for All Music says that "Even though the music is all but unknown, the group has performed these pieces as a live program with powerful effect in the past." and "This is a fine closing chapter to a remarkable career."In The Guardian, Nicholas Kenyon gave this album four stars and says that "They [the Hilliard Ensemble] have admirably decided to quit while they’re ahead, and take their leave with this subtle, underplayed collection of carols and motets from the English repertory" and he add that "We will miss the Hilliards' unique explorations."

Track listing
ECM New Series – ECM 2408 NS.

Personnel
Hilliard Ensemble
David James – countertenor
Rogers Covey-Crump – tenor
Steven Harrold – tenor
Gordon Jones – baritone

References

ECM Records albums
ECM New Series albums
2014 albums
Albums produced by Manfred Eicher